The 2018 Democratic Party for the People leadership election was held on 4 September 2018. It was the party's first leadership election since its formation in May 2018 from the merger of the Democratic Party and the majority faction of Kibō no Tō. The race was held to choose a successor to interim leaders Yuichiro Tamaki and Kohei Otsuka. The elected leader was slated to serve a 3-year term.

Interim co-leader Tamaki won the leadership election by a large margin against Representative Keisuke Tsumura.

Candidates

Running 
Yuichiro Tamaki, member of the House of Representatives for Kagawa 2nd district and interim party co-leader.
Keisuke Tsumura, member of the House of Representatives for Chūgoku proportional representation block and former Parliamentary Secretary for the Cabinet Office.

Results

References 

2018 elections in Japan
Political party leadership elections in Japan
September 2018 events in Japan
Democratic Party for the People leadership election